Cryptoblepharus furvus is a species of lizard in the family Scincidae. The species is endemic to Normanby Island in Papua New Guinea.

References

Further reading
Cogger HG (2014). Reptiles and Amphibians of Australia, Seventh Edition. Clayton, Victoria, Australia: CSIRO Publishing. xxx + 1,033 pp. .
Horner P (2007). "Systematics of the snake-eyed skinks, Cryptoblepharus Wiegmann (Reptilia: Squamata: Scincidae) – an Australian-based review". The Beagle Supplement 3: 21–198. (Cryptoblepharus furvus, new species).
Wilson, Steve; Swan, Gerry (2013). A Complete Guide to Reptiles of Australia, Fourth Edition. Sydney: New Holland Publishers. 522 pp. .

Cryptoblepharus
Reptiles of Papua New Guinea
Endemic fauna of Papua New Guinea
Reptiles described in 2007
Taxa named by Paul Horner (herpetologist)
Skinks of New Guinea